Wolf Blass is an Australian winery based in Nuriootpa, South Australia within the Barossa Valley wine region.

Overview
It was established in 1966 by Wolfgang Blass (born 2 September 1934), a German immigrant who arrived in Australia in 1961 with little money but with a diploma in winemaking. One of his first jobs was with Tolley, Scott and Tolley as a winemaker. Wolf Blass Wines Ltd was purchased by Mildara in 1991, to form Mildara Blass, and was itself bought by Fosters Brewing six years later, which then acquired the Rothbury Group in 1998.

Contentions by Blass include that "parasitic and idiotic funding systems for overseas promotion mean that overproduced wine from Australian irrigated fruit will hit rock bottom, facing competition from South Africa", and "Barossa should focus on what it does best: full-bodied Shiraz". He has also stated that "No table wine over 15% [alcohol by volume] should ever get any medal, anywhere in the world, ever."

Sponsorship and scholarships 
Wolf Blass Sponsor AFL Women's.

See also
South Australian food and drink
German Australian

References

External links
Wolf Blass official site
Wolf Blass won the Barossa Valley Wine of the Year Trophy at CWSA Best Value 2016

Wineries in South Australia
Foster's Group
Barossa Valley
Treasury Wine Estates
Australian companies established in 1966
Food and drink companies established in 1966